The 2016 Asian Fencing Championships were held in Wuxi, China from 13 to 18 April 2016 at the Wuxi Sports Center.

Medal summary

Men

Women

Medal table

References

Asian Fencing Federation

Asian Championship
Asian Fencing Championships
Asian Fencing Championships
Asian Fencing Championships
April 2016 sports events in China